Cerovac is a village in Croatia.

Population

According to the 2011 census, Cerovac had 3 inhabitants.

Napomena: Formed as independent settlement in 1880. From 1953 its name is Cerovac. The census period 1880–1948 includes data for the former settlement of Gornji Cerovci. In the census period 1857–1880 part of the data is included in the settlement of Zrmanja Vrelo.

1991 census

According to the 1991 census, settlement of Cerovac had 36 inhabitants, which were ethnically declared as:

Austro-hungarian 1910 census

According to the 1910 census, settlement of Cerovac had 343 inhabitants in 5 hamlets, which were linguistically and religiously declared as:

Literature 

  Savezni zavod za statistiku i evidenciju FNRJ i SFRJ, popis stanovništva 1948, 1953, 1961, 1971, 1981. i 1991. godine.
 Knjiga: "Narodnosni i vjerski sastav stanovništva Hrvatske, 1880–1991: po naseljima, author: Jakov Gelo, izdavač: Državni zavod za statistiku Republike Hrvatske, 1998., ;

References

External links

Populated places in Zadar County
Lika